Domingo Romera Alcázar (26 May 1936 – 6 April 2022) was a Spanish politician. A member of the People's Alliance and later the People's Party, he served in the Senate of Spain from 1984 to 1986 and in the European Parliament from 1986 to 1994. He died in Lleida on 6 April 2022 at the age of 85.

References

1936 births
2022 deaths
People's Party (Spain) politicians
20th-century Spanish politicians]
Members of the Senate of Spain
Members of the Parliament of Catalonia
European People's Party MEPs
MEPs for Spain 1986–1987
MEPs for Spain 1987–1989
MEPs for Spain 1989–1994
Politicians from Barcelona
University of Navarra alumni